{{Automatic taxobox
|taxon=Profunditerebra
|image= Profunditerebra papuaprofundi (MNHN-IM-2013-45509).jpeg
|image_caption= Shell of Profunditerebra papuaprofundi (paratype at MNHN, Paris)
|authority= Fedosov, Malcolm, Terryn, Gorson, Modica, Holford & Puillandre, 2020
|type_species=Profunditerebra papuaprofundi 
|type_species_authority=Malcolm, Terryn & Fedosov, 2020
|subdivision_ranks = Species
|subdivision = See text
|display_parents=3
}}Profunditerebra is a genus of marine snails, gastropod mollusks in the family Terebridae, subfamily Terebrinae.

Species
Species within the genus Profunditerebra include:
 Profunditerebra anseeuwi (Terryn, 2005)
 Profunditerebra brazieri (Angas, 1871)
 Profunditerebra evelynae (Clench & Aguayo, 1939)
 Profunditerebra hiscocki (Sprague, 2004)
 Profunditerebra macclesfieldensis Malcolm, Terryn & Fedosov, 2020
 Profunditerebra okudai (Poppe, Tagaro & Goto, 2018)
 Profunditerebra omanensis (Gargiulo, 2018)
 Profunditerebra orientalis (Aubry, 1999)
 Profunditerebra papuaprofundi Malcolm, Terryn & Fedosov, 2020
 Profunditerebra poppei'' (Terryn, 2003)

References

External links
 Fedosov, A. E.; Malcolm, G.; Terryn, Y.; Gorson, J.; Modica, M. V.; Holford, M.; Puillandre, N. (2020). Phylogenetic classification of the family Terebridae (Neogastropoda: Conoidea). Journal of Molluscan Studies

Terebridae